Daniel or Dan Jansen may refer to:

 Dan Jansen (born 1965), American speed skater
 Daniel Jansen (basketball) (born 1994), American basketball player
 Dan Jansen (sledge hockey), Canadian former ice sledge hockey player
 Danny Jansen (born 1995), American baseball catcher

See also